Breger is a surname. Notable people with the surname include:

Dave Breger (1908–1970), American cartoonist 
Louis Breger (born 1935), American psychologist, psychotherapist, and scholar

See also
Berger